The stiff-spine spiny-rat (Proechimys echinothrix) or Tefe spiny rat, is a spiny rat species found in Brazil and Colombia.

Phylogeny
Morphological characters and mitochondrial cytochrome b DNA sequences showed that P. echinothrix represents one independent evolutionary lineage within the genus Proechimys, without clear phylogenetic affinity for any of the 6 major groups of species.

References

Proechimys
Mammals of Brazil
Mammals of Colombia
Mammals described in 1998
Taxa named by Maria Nazareth Ferreira da Silva